Jon Taylor Embree (born October 3, 1988) is an American football coach and former wide receiver who is the running backs coach for the New York Jets of the National Football League (NFL). He played college football at UCLA and was briefly a member of the San Diego Chargers.

Playing career 

Taylor played wide receiver for 4 years at UCLA. He was signed as an undrafted free agent by the Chargers in 2012 but was cut at the end of the preseason.

Coaching career 
Embree began his coaching career as a graduate assistant at UNLV in 2012, where he was credited for helping convince Jerry Rice Jr. to transfer from UCLA to UNLV for his final season of eligibility. He was also a graduate assistant at his alma mater UCLA for two seasons before joining the Kansas City Chiefs in 2016 as a defensive assistant.

Embree joined the San Francisco 49ers as an offensive quality control coach in 2017, working with his father Jon. He was hired as the tight ends coach at Colorado in 2020, serving on the coaching staff of first-year head coach Karl Dorrell.

Embree was named the running backs coach for the New York Jets in 2021, working under former 49ers defensive coordinator Robert Saleh.

Personal life 
Embree's father Jon is currently the tight ends coach for the Miami Dolphins and was the head coach at Colorado for two seasons. His younger brother Connor is currently an offensive assistant for the Kansas City Chiefs. His grandfather John Embree played two years in the NFL for the Denver Broncos.

References

External links 
 
 New York Jets profile
 UCLA Bruins profile

1988 births
Living people
Sportspeople from Denver
Sportspeople from Overland Park, Kansas
Players of American football from Denver
Players of American football from Kansas
Coaches of American football from Colorado
Coaches of American football from Kansas
American football wide receivers
UCLA Bruins football players
San Diego Chargers players
UNLV Rebels football coaches
UCLA Bruins football coaches
Kansas City Chiefs coaches
San Francisco 49ers coaches
Colorado Buffaloes football coaches
New York Jets coaches